The Brilliant Suspension Bridge is a suspension bridge over the Kootenay River near Castlegar, British Columbia. It was built in 1913 by Doukhobors settled in the area to replace a ferry across the river. In 1966 the new Highway 3A bridge replaced this one and it was abandoned. Restoration began in the early 1990s, and the bridge was declared a national historic site in 1995. It reopened as a footbridge in 2010.

See also
Petrofka Bridge

References

 Brilliant Suspension Bridge, retrieved March 7,2015

Suspension bridges in Canada
West Kootenay
National Historic Sites in British Columbia
Bridges in British Columbia
Bridges over the Kootenay River
Doukhobors